Herbert Jefferson Hutton (November 26, 1937 – April 8, 2007) was a United States district judge of the United States District Court for the Eastern District of Pennsylvania.

Education and career

Born in Philadelphia, Pennsylvania, Hutton received an Artium Baccalaureus degree from Lincoln University in 1959 and a Juris Doctor from Temple University School of Law in 1962. He was an attorney with the Pennsylvania Housing and Home Finance Agency from 1962 to 1964. He was in private practice in Philadelphia from 1964 to 1988. He was a hearing officer for the Board of Revision of Taxes in Philadelphia from 1982 to 1988.

Federal judicial service

Hutton was nominated by President Ronald Reagan on May 17, 1988, to a seat on the United States District Court for the Eastern District of Pennsylvania vacated by Judge Clarence Charles Newcomer. He was confirmed by the United States Senate on August 11, 1988, and received his commission on August 12, 1988. He assumed senior status on September 6, 2003. Hutton served in that capacity until his death.

Personal life and death

Hutton died on April 8, 2007, in Wynnewood, Pennsylvania after an extended illness.

See also 
 List of African-American federal judges
 List of African-American jurists

References

Sources
 

1937 births
2007 deaths
African-American judges
Judges of the United States District Court for the Eastern District of Pennsylvania
United States district court judges appointed by Ronald Reagan
20th-century American judges
Lawyers from Philadelphia
Lincoln University (Pennsylvania) alumni
Temple University Beasley School of Law alumni
Pennsylvania lawyers